Karlo-Marksove, renamed Sofiivka in 2016, is an urban-type settlement in Yenakiieve Municipality (district) in Donetsk Oblast of eastern Ukraine. Population:

Demographics
Native language as of the Ukrainian Census of 2001:
 Ukrainian 14.76%
 Russian 84.92%
 Belarusian 0.10%
 Moldovan (Romanian) and Hungarian 0.01%

References

Urban-type settlements in Horlivka Raion